Mauritz Olof Andersson (22 September 1886 – 1 November 1971) was a middleweight Greco-Roman wrestler from Sweden. He competed at the 1908 and 1912 Summer Olympics and won a silver medal in 1908. Four years later he was eliminated in the fourth round.

References

External links
 

1886 births
1971 deaths
Olympic wrestlers of Sweden
Wrestlers at the 1908 Summer Olympics
Wrestlers at the 1912 Summer Olympics
Swedish male sport wrestlers
Olympic silver medalists for Sweden
Olympic medalists in wrestling
Medalists at the 1908 Summer Olympics
Sportspeople from Gothenburg